Kaisa Varis (born 21 September 1975, in Ilomantsi) is a Finnish retired cross-country skier and biathlete. Her career has been marred by doping convictions: as a cross-country skier, she was involved but not suspended in a doping scandal and in 2003 she was suspended two years for doping use. After her suspension, she returned as a biathlete in 2007, but in 2008 she received a lifetime ban from all International Biathlon Union (IBU) competitions after another positive doping test. However, her lifetime ban was overturned in March 2009 because the Court of Arbitration for Sport ruled that the IBU failed to adhere to correct testing procedures; she remains eligible to compete in biathlon.

Career

Cross-country skiing
In cross-country skiing, Varis competed from 1995 to 2006. Her biggest success was the win of the bronze medal in the 15 km at the 2001 FIS Nordic World Ski Championships, but she is better known for her doping controversies at those championships: Varis was part of the 4 × 5 km relay that was disqualified when fellow skiers Virpi Kuitunen and Milla Jauho were disqualified for taking hydroxyethyl starch, a banned blood plasma expander. Varis was originally implicated, but later was cleared in this scandal.

Varis's best individual finish at the Winter Olympics was fourth in the 15 km at Salt Lake City in 2002. She also has ten individual career victories at various distances from 1998 to 2002.

Two years after the first doping incident, at the 2003 World Championships in Val di Fiemme, she was suspended for five days before the event's start due to a high hemoglobin count, though was allowed to compete when a second test came back five days later with a lower count. Varis attended the 30 km event, but was later disqualified for taking EPO, an endurance-enhancing drug, and served a two-year suspension as a result.

Though she qualified, she did not compete in the 2006 Winter Olympics in Torino, because she was excluded by Finland's Olympic committee.

Biathlon
Varis switched from cross-country skiing to biathlon and made her debut in the Biathlon World Cup on March 2, 2007, in Lahti, Finland, by finishing 70th in the 7.5 km sprint race. On November 30, 2007, she finished fifth in the 7.5 km sprint event in Kontiolahti. On January 11, 2008, Varis scored her first victory in a biathlon World Cup race in the 7.5 km sprint event in Ruhpolding, Germany, but it was later voided because of her positive doping test.

On January 24, 2008, it was made public that at least the A sample from a test for prohibited substances on January 6 had again tested positive for EPO. Varis denied any doping. However, on January 31, 2008, the IBU announced, that the B sample confirmed the results; due to this case, the Finnish Biathlon Association did not register Varis for the 2008 World Championships. Despite her first ban coming as a cross-country skier, she was considered a repeat offender by the IBU Executive Board and banned from the sport for life on February 11, 2008.

In March 2008 she announced her intention to appeal to overturn the ban. In March 2009, the Court of Arbitration for Sport ruled that the International Biathlon Union had violated Varis' rights under the World Anti-Doping Agency's code by refusing to allow her or a representative to be present when her backup sample was opened for testing. Because of that, her backup sample could not be used as evidence against her, and her ban was overturned.

Cross-country skiing results
All results are sourced from the International Ski Federation (FIS).

Olympic Games

World Championships
 1 medal – (1 bronze)

a.  Cancelled due to extremely cold weather.

World Cup

Season standings

Individual podiums
2 victories
9 podiums

Team podiums
 2 victories 
3 podiums

See also
List of sportspeople sanctioned for doping offences

References

External links
 Accessed 2008-01-29

1975 births
Living people
People from Ilomantsi
Finnish female biathletes
Finnish female cross-country skiers
Finnish sportspeople in doping cases
Doping cases in biathlon
Doping cases in cross-country skiing
Cross-country skiers at the 2002 Winter Olympics
FIS Nordic World Ski Championships medalists in cross-country skiing
Sportspeople from North Karelia